Kiwayuu (alternative spelling Kiwayu) is a small island in the eastern part of the Lamu Archipelago in the Kiunga Marine National Reserve in Kenya. Its main economic activity is fishing, and there is one school, no clinic and one well on the island. Its main tourist attractions are the tidal pools and snorkeling/diving pools on its eastern side, in the Indian Ocean.

The nearest hospital is on Lamu Island outside of Lamu town. Travel from Kiwayuu to Lamu is 7 hours by dhow, or 2 hours by mirror boat.

See also
Kiwayu Airport
Historic Swahili Settlements
Swahili architecture

External links
Jeffrey Gettleman: Bare Feet, Sand Stairs and Isolation to Suit a Prince, July 22, 2007, The New York Times
Kiwayu on Google map (zoom in)

Swahili people
Swahili city-states
Swahili culture
Lamu Archipelago
Populated places in Coast Province
Coastal islands of Kenya